AP-4 complex subunit epsilon-1 is a protein that in humans is encoded by the AP4E1 gene.

Function 

The heterotetrameric adaptor protein (AP) complexes sort integral membrane proteins at various stages of the endocytic and secretory pathways. AP4 is composed of 2 large chains, beta-4 (AP4B1) and epsilon-4 (AP4E1; this gene), a medium chain, mu-4 (AP4M1), and a small chain, sigma-4 (AP4S1).

Clinical relevance 

It is currently hypothesized that AP4-complex-mediated trafficking plays a crucial role in brain development and functioning.

Model organisms				

Model organisms have been used in the study of AP4E1 function. A conditional knockout mouse line, called Ap4e1tm1a(KOMP)Wtsi was generated as part of the International Knockout Mouse Consortium program — a high-throughput mutagenesis project to generate and distribute animal models of disease to interested scientists.

Male and female animals underwent a standardized phenotypic screen to determine the effects of deletion. Twenty four tests were carried out on homozygous mutant mice and four significant abnormalities were observed. Females displayed decreased vertical activity in an open field test, had an abnormal complete blood count, hypoferremia, and a decreased corpus callosum size and enlarged lateral ventricles.

References

External links

Further reading

Genes mutated in mice